Otello Bignami (August 6, 1914 - December 1, 1989) was an Italian violin maker from Bologna.

Life

The life of Otello Bignami closely resembles the lives of various 19th-century violin makers in that he drew much vitality from the farming and craft traditions of his origins. He was a student of Gaetano Pollastri, and the possibility to be able to indicate on his instrument labels that he was a student of Pollastri contributed towards launching his career.

Bignami also practiced the profession of restorer of fine art work and fine furniture, experiences which were undoubtedly valuable in preparing and composing his varnish.

He was awarded prizes at the International Exhibition of Cremona (1949), the Third National Competition of Santa Cecilia Academy of Rome (first prize, 1956), and the Wieniawski Competition in Poland ("best maker in Italy," 1957). He won first prize and Gold medal in 1967 at Bagnacavallo. In 1976 he was awarded a "gold violin" from the city of Bagnacavallo; subsequently he won a prize for his special dedication to teaching.

In the course of over forty years of incessant activity, he built a vast number of instruments in the violin family, including several quartets. His instruments are known for their beauty and acoustic qualities. Amongst his list of illustrious clients was David Oistrakh.

Bignami's role as a teacher, and subsequently director, in the violin making school instituted in Bologna during the early 1980s was decisive in ensuring the continuity of the violin making tradition in this region.

Quotes

"In his rare moments dedicated to relaxation, Otello ventured into another creative art with passion and real dedication: painting. He painted landscapes, still life, and flowers with sweet and melancholic shades, usually giving them away to relations and friends. This was another vehicle for Otello's idealistic and dreamy personality which he  expressed without compromise. A silent and discreet way of offering an unforgettable memory of his soul." - Liutaio in Bologna / Violinmaker in Bologna  by William Bignami

List of Pupils

Pietro Trimboli (1939-)
Curzio Rossi (1936-1977)
Paolo Ansaloni (1948-)
Franco Samoggia (1938-)
Luigi Laterrenia (1952-)
Roberto Regazzi (1956-)
Paola Malaguti (1957-)
Felicia Pansini (1952-)
Gianni Orsini (1938-)
Antonello Adamo (1964-1995)
Barbara Meyer (1959-)
Luca Mazzetti (1960-)
Antonello Gamberini (1961-1991)
Vincenzo Barile (1964-)
Alvise Cristinelli (1958-)
Daniele Canu (1955-)
Alessandro Urso (1963-)
Bruno Stefanini (1960-)
Raffaello Stefanini (1954-)
Sergio Gregorat (1962-)
Giuseppe Gugole (1954-)
Giovanna Benzi (1960-)
Federico Lippi Bruni (1957-)
Ezia di Labio (1960-)
Daniele Canu (1979-1983)
Maurizio Spignoli (1958-2007)

Instruments

In the course of over forty years of incessant activity, he built a vast number of instruments in the violin family, including several quartets (most prominent are from 1975,1976 & 1977). 1975 & 1976 were made as dedications to Gaetano Pollastri. 1977 was made as homage and dedication to Augusto Pollastri (marking the centenary celebration of Augusto's birth). Bignamis instruments are known for their beauty and acoustic qualities.

O. Bignami Viola which was part of a quartet from 1976:

Living Museum

The Bolognese school that Bignami directed is now a living museum. His workshop was carefully reconstructed and is still in use.

Bibliography

William Bignami, Otello Bignami Liutaio in Bologna - Violinmaker in Bologna, 
Vita d'Autore - Note su Otello Bignami Liutaio in Bologna 1914-1989 - A Life of Artistry - Sketches of Otello Bignami violin maker in Bologna, contributions by Roberto Verti, Adriano Cavicchi, Roberto Regazzi, Giovanna Benzi and Tito Gotti, Bologna 1991 and 1993, 
Il Suono di Bologna, Da Raffaele Fiorini ai grandi maestri del Novecento". Catalogo della Mostra nella chiesa di San Giorgio in Poggiale, Bologna 2002, 
A Misura d'Uomo, Venezia 1985, 
Paradigmi. Forme nell'Artigianato, Bologna 1988 and 1989
Daniele Benati - Pierluigi Giordani, Stanze bolognesi - La Collezione Lauro, Bologna 1994
Alessandro Bugatti - Adriano Ragazzi, Tecniche basate sulla conoscenza per la classificazione di oggetti complessi: un'applicazione all'analisi di violini di interesse storico, Brescia 1998
Eric Blot, Un secolo di Liuteria Italiana 1860-1960 - A century of Italian Violin Making - Emilia e Romagna I, Cremona 1994 and 2003, 
Marlin Brinser, Dictionary of 20th Century Italian Violin Makers, 1978 
The Strad, January 1984, Bologna - A living tradition of Violin Making
 
 
Chiara Tenan, Otello Bignami und die Bologneser Geigenbauschule des 20.Jahrhunderts - Diplomarbei zur Erlangung des Akademischen Grades Magistra der Künste in der Studienrichtung 'Violoncello' an der Universität für Musik und darstellende Kunst Mozarteum in Salzburg, Betreuer: Dietmar Machold, Salzburg 2001 
Walter Hamma, Meister Italienischer Geigenbaukunst, Wilhelmshaven 1993,

Notes

References
 http://www.florenusedizioni.com/ilsuono.htm
 http://www.artigianatoartistico.it/fiera_maestriliutai.htm#obignami

Italian musical instrument makers
Italian luthiers
Bowed string instrument makers
1914 births
1989 deaths
20th-century Italian musicians